Caldè railway station is a railway station in the comune of Castelveccana, in the Italian region of Lombardy. It is an intermediate stop on the standard gauge Luino–Milan and Luino–Oleggio lines of Rete Ferroviaria Italiana.

Services 
 the following services stop at Caldè:

References

External links 
 
 Caldè – RFI

Buildings and structures in the Province of Varese
Railway stations in Lombardy